Aleksandar Jović (Serbian Cyrillic: Александар Јовић; born 13 April 1972) is a Serbian professional football manager and former player.

Honours
Hapoel Haifa
 Israeli Championship: 1998–99

Ferencváros
 Hungarian Championship: 2003–04
 Hungarian Cup: 2002–03, 2003–04

References

External links
 

1972 births
Living people
Footballers from Belgrade
Serbia and Montenegro footballers
Serbia and Montenegro expatriate footballers
Serbia and Montenegro international footballers
Association football forwards
FK Železnik players
FK Čukarički players
PAOK FC players
FC Hansa Rostock players
Hapoel Haifa F.C. players
Kickers Offenbach players
FC Carl Zeiss Jena players
Ferencvárosi TC footballers
First League of Serbia and Montenegro players
Super League Greece players
Liga Leumit players
2. Bundesliga players
Nemzeti Bajnokság I players
Expatriate footballers in Greece
Expatriate footballers in Israel
Expatriate footballers in Germany
Expatriate footballers in Hungary
Serbia and Montenegro expatriate sportspeople in Greece
Serbia and Montenegro expatriate sportspeople in Israel
Serbia and Montenegro expatriate sportspeople in Germany
Serbia and Montenegro expatriate sportspeople in Hungary
Serbian football managers
FK Čukarički managers
Serbian SuperLiga managers
Serbian expatriate football managers
Serbian expatriate sportspeople in Greece
Serbian expatriate sportspeople in Slovenia
ND Gorica managers
Expatriate football managers in Slovenia